Tarteel is the Arabic word for hymnody. The term is commonly translated in reference to the Qur'an as recitation, "in proper order" and "with no haste".

In the Quran 
This word is used in chapter 73 named Al-Muzzammil, verse 4 of the Qur'an:

It is also the term used to define the rules explaining proper recitation of the Qur'an in the manner that Gabriel revealed it to Muhammad.

Meaning and practice 
The interpretation of the above-mentioned verse according to Ibn Kathir is "recite the Quran slowly, making the letters clear, for this is an assistance in understanding and pondering the meaning of the Quran."

The fourth caliph, Ali ibn Abi Talib, said that  is delivering words according to their  (outlets for sound or intonations). Saying the words clearly and slowly and reciting with understanding and uttering the contents correctly is of prime importance. One should neither recite the Qur'an with such speed that it might become incomprehensible and bore the listener nor the recitation be so slow that it takes a long time and puts the listeners off. According to him, "Following the middle path is a virtue" or in Arabic: .

See also 
Tilawa
Tajwid
Qur'an reading
Cantillation
Al-Muzzammil
Qira'at

References 

Quran reciting
Islamic terminology